Georgios Bouglas (born 17 November 1990) is a Greek racing cyclist, who currently rides for UCI Continental team .

He rode at the 2014 UCI Road World Championships.

Major results

2011
 10th Banja Luka–Belgrade I
2012
 National Road Championships
1st  Under-23 road race
2nd Road race
2013
 Tour of Romania
1st Stages 2 & 5
 2nd Road race, National Road Championships
 6th Memorial Oleg Dyachenko
 9th Overall Grand Prix of Sochi
2014
 1st  Road race, National Road Championships
 1st  Madison, National Track Championships (with Apostolos Boúglas)
 2nd Banja Luka–Belgrade II
2016
 3rd Time trial, National Road Championships
2017
 8th International Rhodes Grand Prix
2018
 1st Stage 1 Tour of Qinghai Lake
 5th Road race, National Road Championships
 8th International Rhodes Grand Prix
2019
 1st Stage 5 Tour of Qinghai Lake
 National Road Championships
2nd Time trial
5th Road race
 2nd Bursa Orhangazi Race
 3rd Grand Prix Minsk
 5th Bursa Yildirim Bayezit Race
 6th Minsk Cup
2020
 5th Overall Tour of Mevlana
2021
 1st Stage 2 In the footsteps of the Romans
 2nd GP Mediterranean
 9th Grand Prix Gazipaşa
 10th GP Manavgat
2022
 National Road Championships
1st  Road race
3rd Time trial
 4th Grand Prix Gazipaşa
 8th International Rhodes Grand Prix
 9th Grand Prix Megasaray
2023
 10th Overall Tour of Sharjah

References

External links
 

1990 births
Living people
Greek male cyclists
Sportspeople from Trikala
European Games competitors for Greece
Cyclists at the 2019 European Games
Competitors at the 2018 Mediterranean Games
Mediterranean Games competitors for Greece
21st-century Greek people